Peter R. Hooper (1931 - April 21, 2012) was a British geologist, author, and professor in the Department of Geology at Washington State University. He was best known for his research on the Columbia River Flood Basalt Province (CRFBP).

Hooper Glacier
Hooper Glacier is a glacier in the Palmer Archipelago, Antarctica. It was named after Peter R. Hooper by the UK Antarctic Place-Names Committee.

Notable Works
Petrology and Chemistry of the Rock Creek Flow, Columbia River Basalt, Idaho

References

British geologists
1931 births
2012 deaths